JCB Bhilai Brothers FC is an Indian football club based in Bhilai,  that last competed in the I-League 2nd Division.

References 

Association football clubs established in 2004
2004 establishments in India
I-League 2nd Division clubs